Indian Springs is an unincorporated community in Mitcheltree Township, Martin County, in the U.S. state of Indiana.

History
Indian Springs was laid out in 1889. A post office was established at Indian Springs in 1885, and remained in operation until it was discontinued in 1990.

Geography

References

Unincorporated communities in Martin County, Indiana
Unincorporated communities in Indiana